Dave Nemo is an American radio personality who hosts a show on Road Dog Trucking on Sirius XM Radio. Nemo's show is geared toward entertainment and news favored by truck drivers.

Before his current stint with XM, Nemo was best known as the host of The Road Gang, the overnight truckers' show broadcast for many years from WWL (AM) Radio in New Orleans  and heard throughout most of the country through its clear channel signal. Nemo was originally the show's weekend and fill-in host behind Charlie Douglas, then took over the top spot on the show when Douglas left.  Big John Parker then took Nemo's spot as weekend host.

Nemo joined Road Dog (then Open Road) at its inception. His show is aired daily from 7:00 a.m. to 11:00 a.m. EST. Two of his biggest overnight competitors during his Road Gang days, Bill Mack and Dale "The Truckin' Bozo" Sommers, also joined the channel.

Nemo's show is broadcast from studios in Nashville, where guests from the country music industry often stop by.

References

External links
Dave Nemo official site 

Year of birth missing (living people)
Living people
American radio personalities
XM Satellite Radio